Sheridan de Raismes Gibney (June 11, 1903 – April 12, 1988) was a writer and producer in theater and film. He attended Amherst College and received an honorary M.A. from it. He later served as an instructor at Hobart and William Smith Colleges. He began in film in 1931, but tended to see himself more as a playwright. He received 2 Academy Awards for Best Screenplay and Best Story for The Story of Louis Pasteur, sharing the award with Pierre Collings. He particularly had a fondness for Restoration comedy. He would later become President of the Screen Writers Guild twice. As a member of the League of American Writers, he suffered from the Hollywood blacklist. Jack Warner later retracted the claim Gibney was a Communist and Gibney had proposed the group criticize Soviet actions against Finland although that ultimately was unanimously voted down. In his later life Gibney did work in television.

References

External Links 

 Sheridan de Raismes Gibney (AC 1925) Papers in the Amherst College Archives & Special Collections

Best Adapted Screenplay Academy Award winners
Best Story Academy Award winners
Amherst College alumni
1903 births
1988 deaths
20th-century American screenwriters